is a former Nippon Professional Baseball infielder and the current coach of the Hokkaido Nippon-Ham Fighters.。

References

External links

 Career statistics and player information from NPB.jp

1971 births
Living people
Kintetsu Buffaloes players
Japanese baseball coaches
Japanese expatriate baseball players in Mexico
Managers of baseball teams in Japan
Mexican League baseball first basemen
Mexican League baseball third basemen
Nippon Professional Baseball first basemen
Nippon Professional Baseball third basemen
Osaka Kintetsu Buffaloes players
People from Adachi, Tokyo
Baseball people from Tokyo
Tecolotes de Nuevo Laredo players
Tohoku Rakuten Golden Eagles players
Yomiuri Giants players